"Fumetsu no Scrum" is the nineteenth single by Japanese boy band KAT-TUN. The song "Fumetsu no Scrum" is the theme song for MBS/TBS’s drama. “Dragon Seinendan” stars Yasuda Shota, who is a member of Kanjani 8, and is Yasuda’s first solo serial drama. The drama tells the story of the opening of a door that takes one away from daily life into a fantasy.

Single information
Nineteenth single release from KAT-TUN featuring the theme of TV series Dragon Seinendan starring Yasuda Shota. With lyrics like “Chase your dreams with your buddies!”, “Fumetsu no Scrum” is a song describing the bond that exists among friends.  Always game for new challenges, KAT-TUN is releasing the single as the first part of a new project. In addition to the “Fumetsu no Scrum”, there will also be member Tanaka Koki’s solo track along with the inclusion of the PV in the first press regular edition of the single. This will be linked to the solo PVs of the other members in subsequent KAT-TUN singles. Furthermore, the release will include a special clip featuring all five KAT-TUN members and it has been said that the choreography to the song was created by member Taguchi Junnosuke.

Chart performance
In its first week of its release, the single topped the Oricon singles chart, reportedly selling 157,059 copies. This is KAT-TUN’s 19th consecutive single to top the single charts since debuting with “Real Face” back in March 2006 and continued to hold the most consecutive number one singles since debut with fellow Johnny's group, NEWS. KAT-TUN placed at no.7 in the second weeks, reportedly selling 11,862 copies and in the third weeks of its release the single placed at no.20, reportedly selling 3,366 copies.

By the end of the year, Fumetsu no Scrum was reported by Oricon to sell 175,936 and was later certified Gold by RIAJ denoting over 100,000 shipments.

Track listing

Chart

References

External links
 Fumetsu no Scrum  product information

KAT-TUN songs
2012 singles
Japanese television drama theme songs
Oricon Weekly number-one singles
Billboard Japan Hot 100 number-one singles
2012 songs